Nyctimystes cheesmani, commonly known as Cheesman's big-eyed treefrog, is a species of frog in the subfamily Pelodryadinae, endemic to Papua New Guinea.
Its natural habitats are subtropical or tropical moist lowland forests, subtropical or tropical moist montane forests, and rivers.

References

cheesmani
Amphibians described in 1964
Taxonomy articles created by Polbot